Free is the ninth album by German hard rock band Bonfire. It was released in 2003 by Sony/BMG/LZ Records and features music that leans more towards the once popular alternative sound. The album had two covers, one for German outlet and another for worldwide distribution. The German cover had a brown wall background while the other one was white. The band was highly criticized by their loyal fans as well as several critics for the material. Reaction overall from fans was less than favourable. The song "September on My Mind" is about the 9/11 terrorist attack on the World Trade Center in New York City. The reason "Friends" has such a long time frame is due to a large space after the song that was followed by band members Claus Lessmann and Hans Ziller making recordings of the album's songs.

Track listing

Personnel
Claus Lessmann – lead vocals, rhythm guitar
Hans Ziller – lead, rhythm and acoustic guitars, sitar, talk-box, slide
Uwe Köhler – bass
Jürgen Wiehler – drums, percussion

Reviews
Metal Reviews said, "this album really lacks energy. All the songs are slow to mid tempo at best, and it just doesn't sound like the guys were very motivated in the studio. On top of that, the usually charismatic and energetic vocal delivery of Clauss Lessman are very laid back, almost lazy at times."

References

Bonfire (band) albums
2003 albums